Howlett is a surname; Howlett was a baptismal name ​which means, literally, "the son of Hugh". As the naming tradition grew in Europe, baptismal names began to be introduced in many countries. Baptismal names were sometimes given in honour of Christian saints and other biblical figures.  Notable people with the surname include:

 Barbara Howlett, Australian fungal plant pathologist
 David J. Howlett, American scholar of religion and contributor to Mormonism: A Historical Encyclopedia 
 Doug Howlett, NZ rugby player
 Elizabeth Howlett, British politician
 Eric Howlett, American inventor
 Frank Milburn Howlett (1877-1920), British entomologist
 Gary Howlett, Irish international footballer
 Gordon Howlett Dean, Canadian politician
 Jack Howlett, British mathematician and computer scientist
 Jane Howlett, Australian politician
 Jeffrey Howlett, Australian architect
 Liam Howlett, British musician with The Prodigy
 Michael Howlett, American politician
 Mike Howlett, British musician and producer
 Phil Howlett, Tongan rugby league player
 Robert Howlett (1831-1858), British photographer
 Roger Howlett (born 1948), English cricketer
 Virginia Howlett, Canadian designer and painter

Fictional characters
 James "Logan" Howlett, alias The Wolverine from Marvel Comics

See also
 Howletts Wild Animal Park, an English zoo
 Howlite